William O'Hara (April 14, 1816 – February 3, 1899) was an Irish-born American prelate of the Catholic Church. He was the first bishop of the Diocese of Scranton in Pennsylvania, serving from 1868 until his death in 1899. He founded St. Thomas College in 1888.

Biography

Early life and education
William O'Hara was born April 14, 1816, in Dungiven, County Londonderry, in Ireland, to Thomas and Mary Louisa (née Miller) O'Hara. His mother was a member of the Church of Ireland but converted to Catholicism soon after marriage. The family moved to the United States in 1820, settling in Philadelphia. O'Hara received his early education in that city and later attended Georgetown College in Washington, D.C.

In 1834, having decided to become a priest, O’Hara applied to Bishop Francis Kenrick for acceptance as a seminarian for the Diocese of Philadelphia. Kenrick sent him to the Urban College of the Propaganda in Rome, where he completed his philosophical and theological studies. While there, O’Hara befriended fellow seminarian James Andrew Corcoran, who would become a prominent theologian.

Priesthood
O'Hara was ordained to the priesthood on December 21, 1842 by Cardinal Giacomo Filippo Fransoni at the Lateran Basilica. Upon his return to Philadelphia in February 1843, he was first appointed assistant pastor of St. Patrick's Parish . He held that position for thirteen years (1843-1856), during which time he was sometimes assigned to help at other parishes in Philadelphia and around the state (including Chambersburg and Honesdale).

In addition to his pastoral duties, O’Hara was named rector of St. Charles Borromeo Seminary in 1853 by Bishop John Neumann. He also filled the chair of moral theology at the seminary. Bishop Neumann increased the heavy workload of the rector-professor-assistant in 1856, when he promoted O’Hara to full pastor of St. Patrick's Parish. During his time as pastor, he enlarged the church, built a new rectory, renovated the parochial school, and brought in the Sisters of St. Joseph and the Christian Brothers to staff the school. After he left Philadelphia, O’Hara would return to St. Patrick's to celebrate Mass on Saint Patrick's Day for many years.

O’Hara was named vicar general of the diocese in 1860 by Bishop James Wood, leaving the seminary but remaining at St. Patrick's Church. In 1866 he served as an official at the Second Plenary Council of Baltimore.

Bishop of Scranton
On March 3, 1868, O'Hara was appointed the first Bishop of Scranton by Pope Pius IX. He received his episcopal consecration on  July 12, 1868, from Bishop Wood, with Bishops William Elder and Patrick Lynch serving as co-consecrators, at the Cathedral of Sts. Peter and Paul in Philadelphia. 

The diocese had been separated from the Archdiocese of Philadelphia.  It consisted of ten counties in Northeastern Pennsylvania. When O'Hara became bishop, the diocese had a Catholic population of 25,000 with 47 churches, 25 priests, and two parochial schools with four students. By the time of O'Hara's death 31 years later, there were 125,000 Catholics, 78 churches, 130 priests, and 40 parochial schools with 12,000 students. In 1888 he founded St. Thomas College for Young Men.

Early in his tenure, O'Hara attended the First Vatican Council in Rome(1869-1870), where he voted in favor of papal infallibility. He spent a decade in court after a priest sued the bishop for removing him from his position as pastor of the Church of the Annunciation Parish in Williamsport, but the Supreme Court of Pennsylvania ruled in O'Hara's favor in 1881. He ordained Francis Hodur, a Polish priest who would later break with the Catholic Church under O'Hara's successor and establish the Polish National Catholic Church.

O'Hara recognized the golden jubilee of his priestly ordination in 1892 and the silver jubilee of his episcopal consecration the following year. Given his advanced age, he requested a coadjutor bishop to assist and eventually succeed him, and he received Michael John Hoban in 1896.

William O'Hara died in Scranton on February 3, 1899, at age 82. At the time of his death, he was the oldest Catholic bishop in the United States. He was buried under the main altar of St. Peter's Cathedral before being exhumed and reinterred at Cathedral Cemetery in Scranton.

References

1816 births
1899 deaths
University of Scranton
Georgetown University alumni
People from County Londonderry
19th-century Roman Catholic bishops in the United States
Roman Catholic bishops in Pennsylvania
Irish emigrants to the United States (before 1923)
University and college founders